AROM or Arom may refer to:

 Active range of motion (AROM),  a category of therapeutic exercises related to joint range of motion
 Artificial rupture of membranes (AROM), in childbirth
 Simha Arom (born 1930), a French-Israeli ethnomusicologist

See also
Sawang Arom District, Thailand